Petr Šlachta (born 1 January 1993) is a Czech handball player for EHV Aue and the Czech national team.

He participated at the 2018 European Men's Handball Championship.

References

External links

1993 births
Living people
People from Valašské Meziříčí
Czech male handball players
Expatriate handball players
Czech expatriate sportspeople in Germany
Czech expatriate sportspeople in Hungary
Sportspeople from the Zlín Region